Serif (Europe) Ltd is a privately owned British developer and publisher of software. It provides software and associated products direct to customers through its website and contact centre in the United Kingdom, and through retailers.

The wider 'Serif Group Ltd', also operates a question and answer support website called CommunityPlus and a now closed gifts and gadgets website called Gizoo.

History 

Serif was founded in 1987 by a small team of software engineers, with the objective of creating lower-cost alternatives to existing Desktop Publishing (DTP) software packages using the Microsoft Windows platform.

The first Serif product to be released was called PageStar: a simple, low-cost advertisement layout program for Windows 2.0. This was expanded in 1990 with their follow-up, PagePlus (originally for Windows 3.0), which would go on to win 'Best Software' at the Computer Shopper Awards 2014. In subsequent years, this was accompanied by other software products in the 'Plus' range, including DrawPlus (1994), PhotoPlus (1999), WebPlus (2000), and MoviePlus (2003).

In 1996, Serif was acquired by American company Vizacom (formerly known as Allegro New Media); however, ownership was sold back to Serif senior management in 2001.

The successor to their DrawPlus product, Affinity Designer (a vector art & design package), was launched in 2014 for macOS. It was Serif's first product for macOS, and had been written from scratch specifically for it. This was followed in 2015 by the second Affinity product (and successor to PhotoPlus), Affinity Photo (a photo editing & design package).

In 2016, following the release of Affinity Designer and Affinity Photo for Windows, Serif ceased development for their 'Plus' product range to focus exclusively on the Affinity product range. Support for the legacy product range ended in July 2022.

Affinity Publisher, the successor to PagePlus and the third addition to the Affinity product line, was released in 2019. There are no current plans by Serif to replace the WebPlus and MoviePlus product lines in the Affinity range.

Products 

The following are all software packages, for the following applications:

Current products 
Affinity Designer: Vector graphic design software for macOS, Windows and iPad
Affinity Photo: Digital image editing software for macOS, Windows and iPad
Affinity Publisher: Desktop publishing software for macOS, Windows and iPad

Discontinued products 
PagePlus: Desktop publishing software for Windows (replaced by Affinity Publisher)
DrawPlus: Graphic design software for Windows (replaced by Affinity Designer)
PhotoPlus: Digital image editing software for Windows (replaced by Affinity Photo)
WebPlus: Website design software for Windows
MoviePlus: Digital video editing software for Windows
Digital Scrapbook Artist: Digital scrapbooking software for Windows
CraftArtist: Digital scrapbooking software for Windows
PanoramaPlus: Image stitching software for Windows
PhotoStack: Image editing and organisation software for Windows
AlbumPlus: Image organizer software for Windows
Scan, Stitch, and Share: Document mosaicing software for Windows
FontManager: Font management software for Windows

References

External links 
 
 Affinity website
 Serif CommunityPlus support website

Companies based in Nottingham
Companies established in 1987
Software companies of the United Kingdom
British brands
Apple Design Awards recipients